Ali Bhai is a 2007 Indian Malayalam-language action film directed by Shaji Kailas, written by T. A. Shahid, and produced by Antony Perumbavoor through the company Aashirvad Cinemas. It stars Mohanlal as Anwar Ali / Ali Bhai, an undisputed leader in Kozhikode Palayam market and the savior of the poor. The character is based on the real-life person Ali Bappu, who lived in Kondotty a decade ago. The film also features Gopika, Navya Nair, Shamna Kasim, Innocent, Cochin Haneefa, Sai Kumar, Rajan P. Dev, Suraj Venjaramoodu, Siddique, Jagadish, and Shammi Thilakan in supporting roles. The plot is set in Kozhikode market and people whose livelihood depends on it, and also shows the culture of the traditional Barami Muslim community, who migrated from Yemen to Kozhikode centuries ago for trading and are known for making Urus. The plot follows Anwar Ali, a member of a Barami family, who flees home when he is wrongly accused of a theft. He moves to Kozhikode market and grew up as Ali Bhai, the protector of the market. The film completed its post-production in Chennai. The film was released on Independence Day (15 August 2007) and during Onam festival. Chennai-based Pyramid Saimira Group distributed the film outside Kerala. It was released in over 85 screens in Kerala, which was the largest release for a Malayalam film at that time. The film collected 84 lakhs on its first day, making it the highest ever first day gross for a Malayalam film at that time.

Plot 

Alibhai tells the story of Anwar Ali, also known as Alibhai, a King "Dadha" of Palayam market, Kozhikode. He is the unquestionable hero in that area and savior of the poor and downtrodden. The movie opens with flashback sequences that establish young Ali, a member of a Barami family famous for making Urus, who leaves his home in his childhood when his own father, Ahmed Sahib, mistakes him for an unexpected thief and beats him black and blue in front of people. Ali's friend, Sundaran Thampi, tells the mob he saw the theft which was actually done by himself for avenging his father's rivalry with Ahmad Sahib. Ali, knowing he was cheated by his friend, grabs the butcher sword and chops off his hand and flees from his home to the Palayam market. He never backs out from a fight where he grows up as Alibhai, an undisputed leader of the proletarian class, one who stands up to speak for them and even to clench his fists and fight for them and their rights. The son grows up to be a good-hearted toughie.

There are many whose lives revolve around Alibhai. There is Kunjikannan, known popularly as Market Kunji, who is Alibhai's mentor and sort of guardian. There are a bunch of friends and well-wishers who form his gang, including Hameed, Salim Babu, Ramu, Podipaatti Kunjaattu, Sameer Das, Vijayan, Dasappan and a little boy Ganapathy. There is the flower girl Chenthamara who loves him deeply, and there is young Kingini, who is brought up by Alibhai just as a father brings up his daughter. Then comes another girl Ganga, who is given refuge by Alibhai under some special circumstances. He also looks after Abraham, who earlier used to rule over the Palayam market as a goonda, and who was defeated in a fight by Alibhai, following which he was so badly injured that he has been bedridden ever since. All these and many others constitute the near and dear ones of Alibhai.

Once in a while, Alibhai goes to his own house to meet his mother and to secretly leave behind a gift for his father, whom he loves dearly. But all this is destined to change when Sundaran, who was actually the one who had plotted against Ali in his childhood, resurfaces after a long time and with a remorseful heart and begs of Ali to forgive him and to return home. At almost the same time, someone else appears – Danny Abraham, the son of Abraham, who has certain motives of his own. From here, Alibhai's life is destined to change dramatically. They wanted to drive out Alibhai from the market and build a shopping mall with the help of local politicians. They are hand in glove with the city corporation and the state administration and are having the aid of big investors from foreign countries. They are into anything, to settle their old scores and change the Kozhikode city into an international tourist centre which provides fun, wine and women. How Alibhai resists their attempts to save the market and the city. At one stage, they planted a bomb and killed many of his friends and neighbours, including his foster daughter. Ali bhai kills every one behind it single-handedly and become the godfather of that area.

Cast

Filming 
The film pooja ceremony was held at Vismayas Max Studio in Thiruvananthapuram on 21 May 2007 coinciding with Mohanlal's birthday. It was a rare pooja function in Mollywood, around 3000 of his fans attended the function for the birthday celebration.

The film was shot in Kozhikode and Pollachi.  The art director of the film Bobban has erected a huge set for the film depicting Valiyangadi market, which resembles the original to the core. "As it is very hard for Lal sir to shoot amidst his great fans in Kozhikode market, we were forced to recreate the market here", says the producer Antony Perumbavoor. The climax fight was shot in Binny mills, Chennai. Mohanlal was slightly injured with an air gun during the climax shoot.

Release 
Ali Bhai was released on 15 August 2007 on Indian Independence day. Central Pictures distributed the film in Kerala. It made a new record in Malayalam releasing over 80 screens in Kerala. No Malayalam film has ever released in so many screens at that time. Pyramid Saimira Theatres Ltd. (PSTL) the distribution division of Chennai-based multinational entertainment company Pyramid Saimira, one of the world's fastest-growing entertainment groups, distributed the film outside Kerala. The film was released simultaneously in Mumbai, Chennai, Delhi and Bangalore.

Soundtrack 

The film's soundtrack contains 8 songs composed by Alex Paul, with lyrics written by Gireesh Puthenchery.

References

External links 
 

2000s Malayalam-language films
2007 films
Indian action films
Films shot in Kozhikode
Aashirvad Cinemas films
Films directed by Shaji Kailas